Gitithia is a settlement in the Kiambu County of Kenya's Central Province. As of 2019 it had a population of 3,454 across 867 households.

References 

Populated places in Central Province (Kenya)